Tasak (also Romanized as Ţāsak and Tāsak; also known as Kāsak) is a village in Poshtkuh-e Rostam Rural District, Sorna District, Rostam County, Fars Province, Iran. At the 2006 census, its population was 112, in 21 families.

References 

Populated places in Rostam County